AFM Records GmbH is a music label based in Schwalmstadt, Germany. They focus on the heavy metal musical genre, signing bands such as U.D.O., Doro, Lordi, Kotipelto, Masterplan, Nostradameus, Redlight King, and Annihilator.

In 2005, Candlelight Records signed a cooperative deal with AFM to mutually release and market several titles.

The exclusive distribution in Greece is being carried out by Infinity Entertainment IKE.

Current and former artists

A 
 Absolute
 Almah
 Annihilator
 Arion
 Armored Dawn
 At Vance
 Avantasia
 Axxis

B 
 Beautiful Sin
 Betzefer (2010–present)
 Black Messiah
 Blackmore's Night
 Bloodbound
 Borealis
 Brainstorm
 Brothers of Metal

C 
 Circle II Circle
 Cruachan
 Crystal Viper
 Communic
 Crystal Ball

D 
 Dalriada
 Danko Jones
 Dark Age
 Dark at Dawn
 Dead City Ruins
 DeadRisen
 Debauchery
 Destruction
 Dezperadoz
 Dionysus
 Doro
 Dragonland
Dynazty

E 
 Eden's Curse
 Edguy
 Eisbrecher
 Ektomorf
 Elvenking
 Epysode
 Evergrey
 Evidence One

F 
 Fear Factory

G 
 Gama Bomb
 Gwar
 Gothminister

H 
 Headhunter
 Heavenly
 Helion Prime
 Helstar

I 
 Iron Mask
 Iron Savior
 Illdisposed

J 
 Jon Oliva's Pain
 Jorn

K 
 Korzus
 Kotipelto
 Krokus
 Kryptos (band)

L 
 Leaves' Eyes
 Lion's Share
 Lansdowne
 Lordi
 Lyriel

M 
 Made of Hate
 Magica
 Masterplan
 Mekong Delta
 Michelle Darkness
 Ministry
 Mob Rules
 Mors Principium Est
 Morton

N 
 Neverland
 Nightmare
 Nocturnal Rites
 Nostradameus

O 
 Oz
Onslaught
Orden Ogan

P 
 Paradox
 Personal War
 President Evil
 Pro-Pain
 Pure Inc.
 Pyogenesis
 Pyramaze

R 
 Rawhead Rexx
 Rhapsody of Fire
 Rob Rock
 Redemption
 Redlight King

S 
 Schattenmann
 Sencirow
 Serious Black
 Shaaman
 Shakra
 Silent Force
 Silent Skies
 SOiL
 Solution .45
 Squealer
 Steel Attack

T 
 Tankard
 Tarantula
 The Poodles
 Theatre of Tragedy
 Tracee Lords

U 
 U.D.O.

V 
 Voice
 Vanishing Point

W 
 We Butter the Bread with Butter
 Whitesnake
 Wicked Wisdom
 Wolfpack

Y 
 Yargos

References

External links 

  

German record labels
IFPI members
Heavy metal record labels